Switzerland competed at the 1900 Summer Olympics in Paris, France.

Medalists
Gold medals were not awarded at the 1900 Games.  A silver medal was given for a first place, and a bronze medal was given for second.  The International Olympic Committee has retroactively assigned gold, silver, and bronze medals to competitors who earned 1st, 2nd, and 3rd-place finishes, respectively, in order to bring early Olympics in line with current awards.

Gold
 Emil Kellenberger — shooting, three positions military rifle
 Karl Röderer — shooting, individual military pistol
 Konrad Stäheli — shooting, kneeling military rifle
 Friedrich Lüthi, Paul Probst, Louis Richardet, Karl Röderer, Konrad Stäheli — shooting, team military pistol
 Franz Böckli, Alfred Grütter, Emil Kellenberger, Louis Richardet, Konrad Stäheli — shooting, team military rifle
 Bernard de Pourtalès, Hélène de Pourtalès, Hermann de Pourtalès — sailing, 1-2 ton race 1

Silver
 Emil Kellenberger — shooting, kneeling military rifle
 Bernard de Pourtalès, Hélène de Pourtalès, Hermann de Pourtalès — sailing, 1-2 ton race 2

Bronze
 Konrad Stäheli — shooting, individual military pistol

Results by event

Fencing

Switzerland first competed in fencing at the Olympics, in the sport's second appearance. The nation sent three fencers.

Gymnastics

Switzerland competed again at the second gymnastics competition.  This time, the nation won no medals in a heavily France-dominated single event.

Sailing

Switzerland had one boat compete in 1900, racing three times. The Lérina took gold in the first 1–2 ton race and added a silver medal in the second 1–2 ton race, but she did not finish in the open class. Sailing was the first of the sports open to women to be contested, making Hélène de Pourtalès the first female Olympian, Olympic medalist, and Olympic champion.

Shooting

After winning no medals in the first Olympic shooting competitions, Switzerland dominated the second edition of the events, winning five of the nine events, as well as taking two other medals. The Swiss shooters took gold medals in both of the team events, as well as the individual gold medals in military pistol, kneeling military rifle, and overall military rifle.

References

Nations at the 1900 Summer Olympics
1900
Olympics